Homage to Clio is a book of poems by W. H. Auden, published in 1960.

The book contains Auden's shorter poems written between 1955 and 1959, including a group of poems on historical themes first published as a pamphlet titled The Old Man's Road (1956). The book contains three parts: a group of short poems, "Dichtung und Wahrheit: An Unwritten Poem" (in prose), and another group of short poems.

The short poems in the book include the title poem, "T the Great", "Makers of History", "You", "On Installing an American Kitchen in Lower Austria", "Tonight at seven thirty" and others.

The book is dedicated to A. E. and E. R. Dodds

References
John Fuller, W. H. Auden: A Commentary (1999)
Edward Mendelson, Later Auden (1999)

External links
 The W. H. Auden Society

1960 poetry books
Books by W. H. Auden
Poetry by W. H. Auden
Random House books